Nusa Barong is a small uninhabited island located south of Java, and is part of Puger District of Jember Regency, East Java Province, in Indonesia.

References

Landforms of East Java
Islands of East Java
Uninhabited islands of Indonesia